Renswoude is a municipality and a town in the central Netherlands, in the province of Utrecht.

Topography

Dutch Topographic map of the municipality of Renswoude, June 2015

Notable people 
 Jan Hendrik Waszink (1908–1990) a Dutch Latin scholar and academic
 Roel Robbertsen (born 1948) a Dutch politician and pig farmer
 Henk-Jan Held (born 1967) a volleyball player, team silver medallist at the 1992 Summer Olympics and team gold medallist at the 1996 Summer Olympics
 Maarten Van Garderen (born 1990) a Dutch male volleyball player, member of the Netherlands men's national volleyball team

Gallery

References

External links
 
Official website

 
Municipalities of Utrecht (province)
Populated places in Utrecht (province)